Tatobotys depalpalis is a moth in the family Crambidae. It was described by Strand in 1919. It is found in Taiwan and China (Fujian).

References

Moths described in 1919
Spilomelinae